Mercury Rising is an annual professional wrestling pay-per-view (PPV) event currently produced by the World Wrestling Network (WWN) under the name WWNLive Supershow: Mercury Rising. The event takes place during WrestleMania weekend, at a venue in the same metropolitan area the WrestleMania is held, and features talent from WWN's affiliate promotions, including EVOLVE, Full Impact Pro and SHINE.

From 2010 to 2014, Mercury Rising events were promoted by WWN affiliate Dragon Gate USA. In December 2014, WWN confirmed they were putting the Dragon Gate USA brand on an indefinite hiatus.

DGUSA Mercury Rising

2010

2011

2012

2013

2014

WWNLive Mercury Rising

2015

2016

2017

2018

2019

References

External links
WWNLive.com
DGUSA.tv

Dragon Gate USA shows
Professional wrestling shows